George B. Lyle was briefly mayor of Atlanta during the month of May in 1942. Roy LeCraw had fought a tough campaign against incumbent William Hartsfield and won on a slim margin but just a few months after taking office, he joined the army leaving mayor pro-tem Lyle until new elections could be held. In late May, Hartsfield was elected by a large margin being the only well-known candidate. Lyle died on December 14, 1948, at the age of 64.

References

William Berry Hartsfield (1978), Harold H. Martin, Latin Corp
Charlie Brown Remembers Atlanta (1982), Charles M. Brown, R. L. Bryan Company

Year of birth missing
1948 deaths
Mayors of Atlanta